Müschede is a village in the city of Arnsberg in North Rhine-Westphalia, Germany.

Geography
Müschede is located on the eastern slope of Röhrtals, between the villages Hüsten and Hachenburg. Opposite the town is "der Müssenberg," a 427.5 meter tall mountain, the highest elevation in the city Arnsberg.

Between the Ruhr and the built-up area of Müschede is the site of the former military training area, which has evolved in recent years into a popular recreation area. With an area of 11.41 square kilometers, Müschede makes up about 5.6% of the total area of Arnsberg.

External links

 Official website 
 Schützenfest Müschede

 
Former municipalities in North Rhine-Westphalia
Hochsauerlandkreis